Monte Sernio is a remote mountain of the Carnic Alps, in Udine, northeast Italy, with an elevation of 2,187 m. It is located, together with the nearby Creta Grauzaria,  in the mountain chain between the Incarojo Valley, near the village of Paularo, and the Aupa Valley. It was first climbed in 1879 by sisters Minetta and Annina Grassi.

References

Mountains of the Alps
Mountains of Friuli-Venezia Giulia